Charles E. Exley Jr. was the President (1976–1988), Chairman (1984–1992), and CEO (1983–1993) of NCR Corporation.

Early life and career
Exley obtained a B.A. from Wesleyan University in 1951 and an MBA from Columbia Business School in 1954.  A 22-year veteran of the Burroughs Corporation, Exley was appointed president of NCR in 1976 and served in that position until 1988. He served as CEO from 1983 to 1993 and Chairman from 1984 to 1992.

References

Wesleyan University alumni
Columbia Business School alumni
Living people
Burroughs Corporation people
NCR Corporation people
American chairpersons of corporations
Year of birth missing (living people)
American chief executives